Samuel Levi Jones (born 1978) is an American artist, he is known for his paintings and assemblage art. Many of his works are abstract, and centered on African-American history, and identity; often using historically sourced materials.

Biography 
Samuel Levi Jones was born in 1978 in Marion, Indiana, into an African-American family. Jones is related (great nephew, through marriage) to Abraham S. Smith, one of the two men publicly lynched in 1930 in Marion, Indiana. 

He attended Taylor University (B.A. degree in communications studies); Herron School of Art and Design (B.F.A. degree 2009 in photography); and Mills College (M.F.A. degree 2012 in studio art). His first solo exhibition, Samuel Levi Jones: Left of Center (2019) at the Indianapolis Museum of Art at Newfields.

Jones work is included in public museum collections including the San Francisco Museum of Modern Art, the Whitney Museum of American Art, Rubell Museum, the Studio Museum in Harlem, the Fine Arts Museums of San Francisco, and the Los Angeles County Museum of Art (LACMA).

See also 

 List of African-American visual artists
Paulson Fontaine Press

References 

1978 births
Living people
African-American painters
People from Marion, Indiana
Taylor University alumni
Herron School of Art and Design alumni
Mills College alumni
Assemblage artists
21st-century African-American people